Juan Ramón Epitié-Dyowe Roig (born 12 October 1976), known as Epitié, is an Equatoguinean retired footballer who played as a forward.

Club career
Born in Manresa, Barcelona, Catalonia, Epitié played in Spain for the vast majority of his professional career, starting with local Palamós CF in the fourth division. He was signed by two La Liga clubs, Deportivo Alavés and Racing de Santander, but never appeared officially for either.

On loan precisely from the Cantabrians, Epitié joined Bnei Yehuda Tel Aviv F.C. in Israel in early 2004. He failed to impress, only appearing in one Toto Cup match, and ended up signing with another side in the country, F.C. Ashdod, meeting a similar fate – he was released after a couple of months.

In the 2004–05 season, Epitié returned to Alavés, now in the second level, and contributed with three goals as the Basques returned to the top flight. He was however released during the ensuing summer, moving to fellow league team CD Castellón.

Epitié re-signed with Alavés in January 2007, but was immediately loaned to California Victory. During his spell in the United States, which lasted less than one month, he played his first and last games against the same opposition, the Portland Timbers.

In the summer of 2007, Epitié returned to his country of adoption, resuming his career in the lower leagues and competing mainly in his native region.

International career
As many players born in Spain, Epitié chose to represent Equatorial Guinea through ancestry. On 1 June 2008, he scored one in the nation's 2–0 home win against Sierra Leone, for the 2010 FIFA World Cup qualifiers.

Personal life
Epitié's younger brother, Rubén, was also a footballer, in the same position. He spent the vast majority of his career in Spain's amateur leagues, and also appeared for Equatorial Guinea internationally.

References

External links

1976 births
Living people
Footballers from Manresa
Citizens of Equatorial Guinea through descent
Spanish sportspeople of Equatoguinean descent
Equatoguinean sportspeople of Spanish descent
Equatoguinean people of Catalan descent
Spanish footballers
Equatoguinean footballers
Association football forwards
Segunda División players
Segunda División B players
Tercera División players
Divisiones Regionales de Fútbol players
CE Manresa players
Palamós CF footballers
Getafe CF footballers
Real Madrid Castilla footballers
Deportivo Alavés B players
Recreativo de Huelva players
Racing de Santander players
Burgos CF footballers
Deportivo Alavés players
CD Castellón footballers
Lorca Deportiva CF footballers
Israeli Premier League players
Bnei Yehuda Tel Aviv F.C. players
F.C. Ashdod players
USL First Division players
California Victory players
Equatorial Guinea international footballers
Spanish expatriate footballers
Equatoguinean expatriate footballers
Expatriate footballers in Israel
Expatriate soccer players in the United States
Spanish expatriate sportspeople in Israel
Spanish expatriate sportspeople in the United States
Equatoguinean expatriate sportspeople in Israel
Equatoguinean expatriate sportspeople in the United States